Dóra Bodonyi (born 7 November 1993) is a Hungarian sprint canoeist.

She participated at the 2018 ICF Canoe Sprint World Championships, winning a medal.

References

Living people
1993 births
Hungarian female canoeists
ICF Canoe Sprint World Championships medalists in kayak
Canoeists at the 2019 European Games
European Games medalists in canoeing
European Games silver medalists for Hungary
Olympic canoeists of Hungary
Canoeists at the 2020 Summer Olympics
Medalists at the 2020 Summer Olympics
Olympic medalists in canoeing
Olympic gold medalists for Hungary
Olympic bronze medalists for Hungary